Roadstriker is a 1986 role-playing game supplement for Mekton published by R. Talsorian Games.

Contents
Roadstriker details mecha and expands on transforming from the original Mekton rules.

Reception
Phil Frances reviewed Roadstriker for White Dwarf #87, and stated that "In all, a most worthwhile effort – not as slick as FASA's Mechwarrior or Battletech, but admirably simple and flexible."

David Jacobs reviewed Roadstriker in Space Gamer/Fantasy Gamer No. 79. Jacobs commented that "It's a collection of scenarios complete with NPC's for back up and background, and a great way to introduce roadstrikers to your Mekton gaming."

Reviews
Challenge #49 (March/April, 1991)

References

Mekton
Role-playing game supplements introduced in 1986
Science fiction role-playing game supplements